The U.S. state of Indiana is divided into 1,008 townships in 92 counties. Each is administered by a township trustee.

See also
 Indiana
 List of cities in Indiana
 List of towns in Indiana
 List of Indiana counties

External links
 Census 2000 Gazetteer
 Indiana Township Association
 National Association of Towns and Townships

 
Townships
Indiana